Symplocarpus nabekuraensis Is a plant in the genus Symplocarpus. It is found in Japan.

Description 
As with other plants in the genus Symplocarpus, Symplocarpus nabekuraensis has large leaves that release a foul odor when damaged. Symplocarpus nabekuraensis also has a deep root system.

Distribution 
Symplocarpus nabekuraensis is found in the Honshu region of Japan.

See also 
Symplocarpus foetidus

References 

Orontioideae